Patrik Bačík (born 7 February 1995) is a Slovak professional ice hockey defenceman for HC '05 Banská Bystrica of the Slovak Extraliga.

Bačík began playing as a member of Slovan Bratislava's academy, though he made his Slovak Extraliga debut playing for the Team Slovakia U20 team during the 2013–14 season. He would also have spells with HK Nitra and MHC Martin before returning to Slovan Bratislava in the Kontinental Hockey League. Bačík would go on to play in 138 games in the KHL, during which he also had spells in the Tipsport Liga for MHC Martin, HK Dukla Trenčín and HC '05 Banská Bystrica.

On July 21, 2019, Bačík signed a new contract with Slovan Bratislava, who by this point had left the KHL and announced their intention to return to the Tipsport Liga.

Career statistics

Regular season and playoffs

International

References

External links

 

1995 births
Living people
HC '05 Banská Bystrica players
HK Dukla Trenčín players
MHC Martin players
HK Nitra players
Slovak ice hockey defencemen
HC Slovan Bratislava players
Ice hockey people from Bratislava